Al-Junoob Sport Club, is an Iraqi football club based in Basra, that plays in Iraq Division Three.

History
Al-Junoob Sports Club was founded in 1952 by Mr. Abboud Al Shubbar, who was chosen as the club president at the beginning of its foundation by members of the General Assembly, which was made up of 72 members. Then Mr. Kadhim Jbarah became the club's president from 1953 to 1969, during which time sports teams were formed: football, basketball, volleyball, boxing, weightlifting, bodybuilding, table tennis, badminton, and cycling team, with the number of club members increasing to 250. In the 1980s, women's sports teams were formed.

Stadium
In 2015, the club's building and infrastructures were rebuilt, including the rehabilitation of a Al-Junoob stadium with a capacity of 1,000 spectators.

See also 
 2000–01 Iraqi Elite League

References

External links
 Iraq Clubs- Foundation Dates
 Basra Clubs Union

Football clubs in Iraq
1952 establishments in Iraq
Association football clubs established in 1952
Football clubs in Basra
Basra